Cymindis macularis is a species of ground beetle in the subfamily Harpalinae. It was described by Fischer Von Waldheim in 1824.

References

macularis
Beetles described in 1824